Sofie Börjesson (born 31 May 1997) is a Swedish handballer for Vipers Kristiansand.

She represented Sweden at the 2013 European Women's U-17 Championship, 2014 Women's Youth World Championship, 2015 Women's U-19 European Championship and 2016 Women's Junior World Championship.

Achievements 
Swedish Championship:
Winner: 2022
Junior European Championship:
Bronze Medalist: 2015
Youth European Championship:
Winner: 2013
Norwegian Cup:
Winner: 2022/23

References

1997 births
Living people
People from Uddevalla Municipality
Swedish female handball players
IK Sävehof players
Sportspeople from Västra Götaland County
Expatriate handball players
Swedish expatriate sportspeople in Norway